Sukanta Kishore Ray (5 November 1918 – 23 December 2002) was an Indian politician and judge. Her served as the Chief Justice of Odisha High Court. He was also the acting Governor of Odisha. His father, Bira Kishore Ray, was the first Chief Justice of the Odisha High Court. Sukanta Kishore Ray died on 23 December 2002, at the age of 84.

References

1918 births
2002 deaths
Chief Justices of the Orissa High Court
Governors of Odisha
Indian judges